The following highways are numbered 428:

Canada
Manitoba Provincial Road 428

Japan
 Japan National Route 428

United States
  Louisiana Highway 428
  Maryland Route 428
  Nevada State Route 428 (former)
  New York State Route 428 (former)
  Pennsylvania Route 428
  Puerto Rico Highway 428